Nigel Hemming is a UK-based Christian songwriter and musician known for writing on and producing the Great Big God series and his involvement on the Vineyard Come Now Is the Time to Worship and Hungry albums.

Background 

After leaving university, Hemming worked as a primary school teacher and as a musician. In the early 1990s, he was the keyboardist for the band Fat and Frantic, performing at festivals such as Greenbelt and was part of the line-up when the band reformed in 2011.

Hemming became involved with recording for Vineyard Music UK when Brian Doerksen invited him to play keyboards on the Vineyard UK album Come Now Is the Time to Worship. Following the success of Come Now Is the Time to Worship Doerksen asked Hemming to co-produce Vineyard UK's second album Hungry. Hemming wrote the song "Beautiful God" from the album Come Now Is the Time to Worship and co-wrote the song "The Rhythm of Heaven" on the Hungry album.

The first Great Big God album was released in 2001. It was called Great Big God after the title song written by Nigel and Jo Hemming. Hemming co-produced the album with Brian Duane and wrote five of its songs.

Since the release of the first Great Big God album Hemming has produced and written for all six of the Vineyard Great Big God releases. He has now written over 30 children's worship songs and is widely regarded as having created "one of the most successful series of UK children's albums ever."

Hemming is a Vineyard Churches UK and Ireland pastor. He worked on staff at Birmingham Vineyard Church throughout the 2000s until moving in 2011 to become the senior pastor at the Winchester Vineyard Church with his wife Jo.

Hemming was a director of Vineyard Music UK from 2014 to 2017.

Releases

References 

1969 births
Living people
British performers of Christian music